Menachem Ussishkin ( Avraham Menachem Mendel Ussishkin) (August 14, 1863 – October 2, 1941) was a Russian-born Zionist leader and head of the Jewish National Fund.

Biography 

Menachem Ussishkin was born in Dubrowna in the Belarusian part of the Russian Empire. In 1889, he graduated as a technical engineer from Moscow State Technical University, today known as Bauman Moscow State Technical University.  Ussishkin was among the founders of the BILU movement and the Moscow branch of the Hovevei Zion. He also joined the Bnei Moshe society founded by Ahad HaAm. In 1891, he made his first trip to Palestine.

Ussishkin served as Secretary of the First Zionist Congress. In 1903, Ussishkin visited Palestine and was not present at the Sixth Zionist Congress where the Uganda plan was presented. Soon after, he became one of the main leaders who strongly opposed this plan, until it was abandoned in the Seventh Zionist Congress in 1905. 

He was one of the Jewish delegates to the Paris peace conference after World War I.

In 1919, Ussishkin made aliyah to what was in the process of becoming Mandatory Palestine on board the ship Ruslan. In 1920, he was appointed head of the Zionist Commission in Palestine. In his pamphlet "Our Program", he advocated group settlement based on labour Zionism. Under his influence, the Zionist movement actively supported the establishment of agricultural settlements, educational and cultural institutions, and Jewish polytechnic - later the Technion.

In 1923, Ussishkin was elected President of the Jewish National Fund which he headed until his death. Ussishkin was behind major land acquisitions in the Hefer, Jezreel and Beit She'an valleys.

Family 

Ussishkin had two children: His daughter, Rachel, married Friedrich Simon Bodenheimer, entomologist and son of Zionist Max Bodenheimer. His son, Samuel, a lawyer, married Elsa Schoenberg. Their son is archaeologist David Ussishkin.

Death and burial 

Ussishkin died in 1941 in Jerusalem at the age of 78. He is buried in Nicanor's Cave at the botanical gardens of the Hebrew University of Jerusalem on Mount Scopus.

Commemoration 

Ussishkin's name is commemorated in many places in Israel. Kibbutz Kfar Menahem is named after him. A group villages in Northern Israel, including Dan, Dafna, and She'ar Yashuv, were collectively named "The Ussishkin Fortresses".

On his 70th birthday, the Rehavia neighborhood council decided to change the name of the street in which he lived, Rechov Keren Kayemet Le'Israel (Jewish National Fund) to Rechov Ussishkin, and move Rechov Keren Kayamet Le'Israel to its present location.

Following Ussishkin's death, many streets and schools in Israel were named after him, as is the largest auditorium at the International Convention Center in Jerusalem.

Gallery

References

External links

Menachem Ussishkin Jewish Agency for Israel
The personal papers of Menachem Ussishkin are kept at the Central Zionist Archives in Jerusalem. The notation of the record group is A24.

1863 births
1941 deaths
Belarusian Jews
Belarusian Zionists
Hovevei Zion
Ashkenazi Jews in Mandatory Palestine
Mandatory Palestine people of Belarusian-Jewish descent
Mandatory Palestine people of Russian-Jewish descent
Jewish National Council members
Labor Zionists
Members of the Assembly of Representatives (Mandatory Palestine)
People from Dubroŭna
People from Jerusalem
Soviet emigrants to Mandatory Palestine
Russian Zionists